Sword Stained with Royal Blood is a wuxia novel by Jin Yong (Louis Cha). It was first serialised in the Hong Kong newspaper Hong Kong Commercial Daily between 1 January 1956 and 31 December 1956. Since its first publication, the novel has undergone two revisions, with the latest edition being the third. Some characters from the novel play minor roles or are simply mentioned by name in The Deer and the Cauldron, another of Jin Yong's novels.

Plot
The novel is set in China towards the end of the Ming dynasty. The protagonist, Yuan Chengzhi, is the son of Yuan Chonghuan, a patriotic general who had been wrongly put to death by the Chongzhen Emperor. After his father's death, Yuan was brought to the Mount Hua School, where he was trained in martial arts by the school's leader, Mu Renqing. Once he has grown up, he leaves Mount Hua in search of adventure. Serendipitous incidents lead him to discover the Golden Serpent Sword and a martial arts manual which once belonged to Xia Xueyi, a long-dead enigmatic swordsman. Yuan inherits Xia's possessions and skills and becomes a powerful swordsman.

Yuan wanders around the land and meets Wen Qingqing, a young maiden from a family of brigands. Wen is actually Xia Xueyi's daughter and she follows Yuan after being expelled from her family. Although Yuan initially wanted to seek redress for his father, he eventually joins Li Zicheng's rebellion to overthrow the corrupt Ming government. He helps the rebels retrieve the gold robbed by the Wen family, sabotages a battery of cannons supplied to the Ming army by foreigners, and finances the rebellion with part of the treasure he discovered in Nanjing. Yuan also befriends several martial artists, who pledge allegiance to him out of respect for his heroism. He organises his followers to form a militia and they pledge to serve and defend the Han Chinese nation from internal and external threats.

While Yuan sees overthrowing the corrupt Ming government as one of his key priorities, he also recognises that the Manchus in northeast China pose an even greater threat to the Han Chinese nation. Eager to prove his loyalty to his fellow Han Chinese, Yuan infiltrates the Manchu capital Mukden and attempts to assassinate the Manchu emperor Huangtaiji, but fails and narrowly escapes. Later, despite holding a grudge against the Chongzhen Emperor for his father's wrongful execution, he saves the emperor from a coup launched by a treacherous noble, Prince Hui. Around the same time, he meets He Tieshou, one of Prince Hui's allies and the leader of the Five Poisons Cult. Yuan succeeds in reforming her and accepts her as his apprentice. He also develops romantic relationships with Wen Qingqing and another maiden, Ajiu, who is actually Princess Changping, a daughter of the Chongzhen Emperor.

Yuan ultimately regrets his decision to support Li Zicheng because after overthrowing the Ming government, Li not only fails to fulfil his promises to restore peace and stability, but also condones his followers' brutality towards the common people. After seeing that the interim government set up by the rebels is as equally corrupt as the former Ming government, Yuan feels so disappointed that he decides to abandon them. In the meantime, Wu Sangui, a former Ming general, defects to the Manchus and allows them to pass through Shanhai Pass. The Manchus eventually conquer the rest of China and establish the Qing dynasty. Yuan realises that he is unable to do anything to reverse the situation and decides to leave for good, so he sails to a distant land (the Bruneian Empire) with his companions.

Characters

Adaptations

Films

Television

Video games
 He Tieshou was a playble character in the 2008 personal computer fighting game Street Fighter Online: Mouse Generation.

References

 
1956 novels
Novels by Jin Yong
Novels first published in serial form
Works originally published in the Hong Kong Commercial Daily
Novels set in the Ming dynasty
Novels about revenge
Novels about orphans
Novels set in the 17th century
Chinese novels adapted into television series
Shun dynasty
Novels set in Shaanxi
Novels set in Liaoning
Novels set in Sichuan